Hédoin de Maille (15 November 1898 – 6 April 1953) was a French equestrian. He competed in the individual dressage event at the 1920 Summer Olympics.

References

1898 births
1953 deaths
French male equestrians
Olympic equestrians of France
Equestrians at the 1920 Summer Olympics
Sportspeople from Tours, France